The Brussels Geographic Conference was held in Brussels, Belgium in September 1876 at the request of King Leopold II of Belgium. At the conference were invited nearly forty well-known experts, mainly they were schooled in the geographic sciences or were wealthy philanthropists. Before the guests returned to their respective countries, they voted to establish the International African Association. This initiative would in the end pave the way for the creation of Congo Free State.

See also
 Berlin Conference of 1884-85

Sources
 Émile Banning, Africa and the Brussels geographical conference, translated by Richard Henry Major, London : Sampson Low, Marston, Searle & Rivington, 1877
 Fondation du Congo, Memoires de Emile Banning, 1927

History of European colonialism
Diplomatic conferences in Belgium
Geography conferences
19th-century diplomatic conferences
1876 in international relations
1876 in Belgium
1876 conferences
19th century in Brussels